Musical salute may refer to:
 Personal anthem, music played to announce the arrival of a dignitary
 Fanfare, a musical flourish